The Republic of China Army is commonly referred to as the Taiwanese Army.

Taiwanese Army may also refer to:

Military of the Qing dynasty, which Taiwan was controlled from 1683 to 1895
Taiwan Army of Japan, an Imperial Japanese Army garrison in Taiwan from 1919 to 1944
Republic of China Armed Forces, the current military forces since 1945, of which the army is a component
Taiwan Garrison Command